Stephen Haley Lister (born 17 November 1961) is a former English footballer who played mainly as a midfielder for Doncaster Rovers, Scunthorpe United, York City and Boston United.

Playing career

Youth
Steve began his career as an apprentice for Doncaster Rovers in 1978.

Doncaster Rovers
Lister made his first appearance for Billy Bremners Doncaster on 20 March 1979 in a 2-2 draw in Division 4 against Reading at Belle Vue. The following season 1979-1980 he was top scorer for the club with 12 goals from midfield, and was being watched by some of the bigger clubs including Liverpool who chose to sign Ian Rush instead.  He went on to score 31 goals in 268 appearances for the club, gaining two promotions and playing for 3 seasons in Division 4 and 3 in Division 3. He was also in the team that beat then top tier QPR in the 3rd round of the FA Cup and subsequently in the side that narrowly lost to Everton at Goodison Park.

Scunthorpe United
At the beginning of the 1985-1986 season Steve moved to Scunthorpe where he spent 7 seasons with them in Division 4. He was the last person to score at the Old Showground as Scunthorpe moved to their new home Glanford Park. He was loaned to York where he played 4 games in the 1990-1991 season. Finally he moved onto Boston United where he played 7 league and 1 FA Cup game.

Later life
He was a Football in the Community Officer at Barnsley and more recently the Coach Development Officer at Rastrick Junior F.C.

In 2003, he and his wife Bev organised the Kick up the 80's Rovers reunion charity event and subsequent match.

References

External links
http://www.doncasterrovers.co.uk/players/KtoM/Lister,Steve.htm

1961 births
Footballers from Doncaster
Association football midfielders
Doncaster Rovers F.C. players
Scunthorpe United F.C. players
York City F.C. players
Boston United F.C. players
English Football League players
Living people
English footballers